is a passenger railway station located in the city of Izumisano, Osaka Prefecture, Japan, operated by the private railway operator Nankai Electric Railway. It has the station number "NK28".

Lines

Layout
The station consists of two opposed side platforms connected by an underground passage.

Platforms

Adjacent stations

History
Tsuruhara Station opened on 15 May 1916.

Passenger statistics
In fiscal 2019, the station was used by an average of 1726 passengers daily.

Surrounding area
 Izumisano City Kitanaka Elementary School

See also
 List of railway stations in Japan

References

External links

  

Railway stations in Japan opened in 1916
Railway stations in Osaka Prefecture
Izumisano